Erwin Johannes Bowien (3 September 1899 – 3 December 1972) was a German painter and author.

Biography 
Bowien was a born in to a family of a construction engineer from East Prussia. His mother also came from there and was descended from a family that had moved to East Prussia in the 18th century.

Bowien went to school in Berlin, attended a gymnasium and studied at the "Ecole professionelle" in Neuchâtel (Switzerland). After the First World War he studied at the Munich Art Academy, the Dresden Art Academy, and the Berlin Art Academy. He then taught himself for four years and gave lectures on art history for the Volkshochschule in Solingen.

After the Nazi seizure of power, Bowien who was an opponent of party, left for the Netherlands. He lived from 1933 to 1942 as a freelance artist in Egmond aan den Hoef, North Holland, in the former home of the philosopher René Descartes.  When Princess Beatrix was born in 1938, Bowien came up with the idea of portraying children in Egmond aan den Hoef who saw the light of day in 1938. The paintings have been transferred by the municipality of Egmond to the Royal Household Archives.

Bowien held exhibitions of his work in The Hague, Hoorn, Alkmaar and Schoorl. He made his name there as a painter and pastel draftsman of landscapes, sea and dune views.

After the German occupation of the Netherlands, Bowien was arrested and jailed for three days. He received information from Germany that his colleagues were willing to hide him. He took advantage of that offer and ended up in a small village in Bavaria where he remained unnoticed by the authorities until the end of the war. After the Second World War he visited Norway, Switzerland, among others. Exhibitions of his work have been organized in many major cities in Germany, but also in Copenhagen and Paris, and his work can be seen in several museums.

Bowien died December 3, 1972, in the house in Weil am Rhein.

References

External links
 Erwin Bowien website 

1899 births
1972 deaths
20th-century German painters
German male painters
20th-century German poets
German male poets
German memoirists
Emigrants from Nazi Germany to the Netherlands
20th-century German male artists